The Celebration Tour is the fourth concert tour by German pop band No Angels. Launched in support of their sixth studio album, 20 (2021), it was originally announced as a special one-off event named Celebration Live to coincide with the twentieth release anniversary of their debut album Elle'ments (2001). Following strong first day ticket sales, the open-air concert was incorporated in a full-length concert tour. The band's first tour in twelve years, it began on 18 June 2022 in Berlin at the Parkbühne Wuhlheide. Following a longer break, it continued on 23 September and concluded on 8 October 2022.

Critical reception
Neue Westfälische editor Heimo Stefula praised the show, writing, "The quartet burned off a firework of hits in just under two hours, which was well received by the audience from the first second." Hessenschau critic Anne Heigel echoed his statements. She wrote: "In Frankfurt, there was deafening applause, beaming faces and pure nostalgia." Heigel noted that the band performed without "any complex stage sets" but instead offered "joint dance choreographies" and some "well-known classics."

Christof Hammer from Stuttgarter Nachrichten was ambivalent about the "fairly conventionally staged program," some "unstable" vocal performances and the "rather dull" sound inside the Liederhalle, but concluded: "Much more [...] counts on this evening: The emotions between a band and its fans, the memories of the carefree youth of the 2000s and the warm feeling of still being there twenty years later and reuniting. Every song, every word from the stage becomes real soul food, the whole concert is almost a happening [...] Seen from this angle: An evening perfectly suited to times like these."

Release
With much of their opening concert at the Parkbühne Wuhlheide tracked by a film crew, on 27 January 2023, the band began releasing videos of their performances that night on their YouTube account.

Set list
This set list is representative of the 18 June 2022 show in Berlin.

 "Daylight in Your Eyes"
 "All Cried Out"
 "Down Boy"
 "Three Words"
 "Send Me Flowers"
 "Someday"
 "Goodbye to Yesterday"
 "A New Day"
 "A Reason"
 "Washes Over Me"
 "Too Old"
 "When the Angels Sing"
 "Still in Love with You"
 "No Angel (It's All in Your Mind)"
 "Mad Wild"
 "Maybe"
 "Back Off"
 "Feelgood Lies"
 "One Life"
 "Let's Go to Bed" 
 "Disappear"
 "Something About Us"
 "There Must Be an Angel"
Encore
"We Keep the Spirit Alive"
"That's the Reason"
"Rivers of Joy" 

Notes
"Down Boy", "Washes Over Me", "Too Old", "Maybe", "Back Off", and "That's the Reason" were omitted from subsequent concerts.

Tour dates

Cancelled shows
On 5 September 2022, the band announced on Instagram that the planned concerts in Erfurt, Rostock and Zürich would be cancelled, citing increasing productions costs as a reason.

References

2022 concert tours
No Angels concert tours